The Wedgwood anti-slavery medallion was an abolitionist symbol produced and distributed by British potter and entrepreneur Josiah Wedgwood in 1787 as a seal for the Society for the Abolition of the Slave Trade. The medallion depicts a kneeling Black man in chains with his hands raised to the heavens; it is inscribed with the phrase "Am I not a man and a brother?"

The figure was likely designed and modeled by Henry Webber and William Hackwood with Wedgwood's involvement. The medallion was produced as a jasperware cameo by Wedgwood's factory—the Etruria Works— and widely distributed in Britain and the United States. These cameos were worn as pendants, inlaid in snuff boxes, and used to adorn bracelets and hair pins, rapidly becoming fashionable symbols of the British abolition movement. The medallion helped to further the abolitionist cause and is today accepted as "the most recognizable piece of antislavery paraphernalia the movement ever produced."

Origin 
On July 5, 1787, the Society for Effecting the Abolition of the Slave Trade resolved to develop a recognizable seal for their cause. The Society solicited the help of prominent British potter and entrepreneur Josiah Wedgwood. On October 16, 1787 a design by Henry Webber was presented to a committee of the Society. According to Mary Guyatt, and "it is fair to suggest that [Wedgwood] would have had some influence over the eventual design" given his personal involvement in the project.  Webber's design depicted a Black male slave in a kneeling posture accompanied by the motto "Am I not a man and a brother?" The motif was adapted from a print design into sculpture, likely by William Hackwood.

Interpretation 
The enslaved man's kneeling position and raised hands are often understood as a reference to supplication, marking him as a Christian appealing to Heaven. Accompanied by an English plea, the depicted man communicates that he is a Westernized figure who shares both a language and faith with a white British or American audience.

Contemporary interpretations of the medallion emphasize that while the design recognizes the commonality of enslaved people, it simultaneously consigns them to a place of weakness and deference to white society. Mary Guyatt writes,

Distribution 
By the end of 1787, Wedgwood began work to produce the design in cameo form at his pottery factory in Etruria, Staffordshire. The quantity of medallions produced and number of variants of the symbol manufactured is not known. According to Mary Guyatt, "basing our figures on the level of demand indicated by the 15,050 copies of Clarkson's pamphlet, A Summary View of the Slave Trade, distributed to supporters in the Society's first fifteen months, it can be presumed that demand for the medallion was of a comparable scale."

The medallions were likely distributed through the network of the Society for the Abolition of the Slave Trade. Wedgwood sent parcels of cameos to Thomas Clarkson as well as to Benjamin Franklin in the United States. Historians generally accept that Wedgwood himself financed the cost of production and distribution; cameos of a similar size were commercially sold for three guineas each (£3/-3).

Wedgwood's anti-slavery cameos were eventually used to adorn a variety of items including snuff boxes, shoe buckles, bracelets, and hair pins which were commercially available in Britain and the United States. These items were purchased by hundreds of movement supporters—many of them middle-class women—who contributed to the increasing fashionability of the abolition movement.

Influence 

In the 1828 a modified version of the medallion appeared featuring a kneeling woman slave and the phrase "Am I not a woman and a sister." This version was intended to specifically bring attention to the plight of enslaved women. George Bourne's 1837 Slavery Illustrated in Its Effects upon Woman and Domestic Society features the female variation of the symbol on its frontispiece.

The American abolitionist newspaper The Liberator featured the kneeling slave figure in its nameplate, likely designed by Hammatt Billings.

African American men participating in the 1968 Memphis sanitation strike carried posters reading "I AM A MAN"—a slogan that has often been traced to the Wedgwood medallion. As Cecelia M. Hartsell writes, "Am I Not a Man and A Brother" was no longer a question, as it had been in the eighteenth and nineteenth centuries—it was a declaration."

Gallery

See also 

 Representation of slavery in European art
 Emancipation Memorial
 Ain't I a Woman?
 I Am a Man!

References 

Abolitionism in the United Kingdom
Abolitionism in the United States
Black people in art
Medals
Race-related controversies in art
Slavery in art